is a 1983 Japanese film in Nikkatsu's Roman porno series, directed by Shingo Yamashiro and starring Ai Saotome.

Synopsis
Innocent female doctor Mineko was seduced by Sachiko, an aggressive lesbian, in her younger days. Mineko begins dating a male coworker, and accepts an invitation to a party at the home of a transvestite patient. Sachiko comes out of Mineko's past, enraged with jealousy, and begins tormenting Mineko and her boyfriend.

Cast
 Ai Saotome: Mineko Kagami
 Sachiko Itō: Kotoe Hiratsuka
 Koichi Iwaki: Shari
 Hiroshi Nawa: Tarō Iruka
 Kōji Minakami: Mamoru  Iruka
 Akiyoshi Fukae: Takehiko Ōbayashi
 Yoshishige Ōtsuka: Eiko Kanzaki
 Yoshishige Ōtsuka: Akiko Kanzaki
 美露: Tommy
 Mitsu Senda: Jōji
 Kotomi Aoki: Akane Minakawa
 Mariko Nishina: Hiromi
 Keiichi Satō: Mikami
 Ryūji Katagiri: Abe
 Madoka Sawa: Julie
 Akira Takahashi: Keiji
 Hiromichi Nakahara: Movie star

Critical appraisal
Female Cats director Shingo Yamashiro was best known as an actor, having debuted in 1957. He appeared in the Battles Without Honor and Humanity series, and one of his better-known appearance for Western audiences is in Kiyoshi Kurosawa's Sweet  Home (1989).

In his Behind the Pink Curtain: The Complete History of Japanese Sex Cinema, Jasper Sharp uses Female Cats as an example of the range of themes possible in the Roman Porno genre, calling it an Argento-esque thriller. In their Japanese Cinema Encyclopedia: The Sex Films, the Weissers compliment Yamashiro's direction as the best thing about the film. They write that he, "goes the extra mile to compose many astonishingly good-looking sequences, punctuated by some creatively stylish camerawork." A lesbian shower sequence between Mineko and Sachiko is singled out for praise. The scene is shot from the shower faucet's point of view, through a spray of water. However they fault the film's unimaginative script and its "lurid plot".

Availability
Female Cats was released theatrically in Japan on December 23, 1983. It was released to home video in VHS format in Japan on March 16, 1984, and re-issued on June 22, 1990. It was released as part of the Nikkatsu Roman Porno Series of VHS releases on December 6, 1991. It was released on DVD in Japan on December 4, 1998, and re-released on DVD on June 23, 2006, as part of Geneon's fourth wave of Nikkatsu Roman porno series. In this format it was issued in the 4-disc Roman Porno series DVD Box, Vol. 1 on March 7, 2008. It is currently scheduled to be released in the USA on DVD May 7, 2013, under the title 'She Cat'.

Bibliography

English

Japanese

Notes

1983 films
1980s erotic thriller films
1980s Japanese-language films
Japanese LGBT-related films
Lesbian-related films
Japanese erotic thriller films
Nikkatsu films
Nikkatsu Roman Porno
1983 LGBT-related films
1980s Japanese films